Lake Anza is a recreational swimming reservoir, located within the Tilden Regional Park, in the Berkeley Hills above Berkeley, California.

History 

The lake was created by the construction of the C L Tilden Park Dam in 1938.  It was named by the East Bay Regional Park Board in honor of Spanish explorer Juan Bautista de Anza.

Lake Anza was constructed in 1938 with financing by the Public Works Administration (PWA) as a recreational lake while also providing water to the Tilden Park golf course. While the golf course no longer uses Lake Anza water, remnants of the water system remain. The beach and stone bath house were constructed by the Works Progress Administration (WPA). The original WPA stone bath house burned down in the 1960s and was replaced with the current facility.

Facilities

The lake area includes amenities such as changing rooms, bathrooms (toilets), and large parking areas. There are areas around the lake reserved for waterfowl, and other areas for dogs.

The lake is open for swimming from May to September. During this time there is an entry fee required, lifeguards are on duty, and a snack bar is open.

See also
Lake Temescal
List of lakes in California
List of lakes in the San Francisco Bay Area
List of dams and reservoirs in California

References

External links

 Findlakes maps of Lake Anza
 Lake Anza
 

Anza
Berkeley Hills
Tilden Regional Park
Beaches of Contra Costa County, California
Parks in Contra Costa County, California
East Bay Regional Park District
1938 establishments in California
Anza
Beaches of Northern California
Anza